This article contains a list of telenovelas sorted by their country of origin. Telenovelas are a style of limited-run television soap operas, particularly prevalent in Latin America.

Angola
 Windeck

Argentina

 Alas, Poder y Pasión ("Wings, Power and Passion")
 Alen, Luz de Luna ("Alen, Moonlight")
 Alma Pirata ("Pirate Soul")
 Amigos son los Amigos ("Friends Will Be Friends")
 Amor Latino ("Latin Love")
 Amor Mío ("My Love")
 Amor Prohibido ("Forbidden Love") 1987
 Amor Sagrado ("Sacred Love")
 Andrea Celeste 1979
 Antonella 1992
 Atraccionx4 ("Attraction to the 4th Power")
 Buenos Vecinos ("Good Neighbors")
 Cabecita ("Little Head")
 Campeones de la Vida ("Champions of Life")
 Cara Bonita ("Pretty Face")
 Carola Casini
 Casi Ángeles ("Almost Angels")
 Celeste, Siempre Celeste ("Celeste, Always Celeste") 1993
 Clave de Sol ("G-Clef") 1987-1990
 Collar De Esmeraldas ("Emerald Necklace")
 Como Vos y Yo ("Like You And Me")
 Con alma de tango ("With Tango Soul")
 Corazones de Fuego ("Hearts of Fire")
 Cosecharás tu Siembra ("You Reap What You Sow")
 Costumbres Argentinas ("Argentine Customs")
 Culpable de este Amor ("Guilty of This Love")
 Culpables ("Sinners")
 De corazón ("Sincerely")
 Déjate Querer ("Let Yourself To Be Loved")
 Doble Vida ("Double Life")
 Dr. Amor ("Dr. Love")
 Dulce Ana ("Sweet Ana")
 El Día Que Me Quieras ("The Day That You Love Me")
 El Refugio (de los Sueños) ("The Refuge (of Dreams)")
 El Sodero de Mi Vida ("The Soda-Water Salesman of my Life")
 El Tiempo No Para ("Time Doesn't Stop")
 El Último Verano ("The Last Summer")
 EnAmorArte
 Entre el Amor y el Poder ("Between Love and Power")
 Estrellita Mía ("My Little Star")
 Franco Buenaventura: El Profe ("Franco Buenaventura: Teacher")
 Frecuencia 04 ("Frequence 04")
 Gasoleros
 Gladiadores de Pompeya ("Gladiators of Pompeii")
 Hombre de Honor ("Man of Honor")
 Hombre de Mar ("Man of the Sea")
 Ilusiones Compartidas ("Shared Illusions")
 Inconquistable Corazón ("Unconquered Heart")
 Jesús, el Heredero ("Jesus, the Heir")
 Juanita, la Soltera ("Juanita, The Unmarried One")
 Kachorra
 La Extraña Dama ("Strange Lady")
 La Lola
 Laberinto ("Labyrinth")
 Los Buscas de Siempre
 Los Cien Días de Ana ("Anna's One Hundred Days")
 Los Médicos de Hoy ("The Doctors of Today")
 Los pensionados ("Pensioners")
 Los Secretos de Papá ("Dad's Secrets")
 María de Nadie ("Maria Of Nobody") 1985
 Más Allá del Horizonte ("Beyond the Horizon")
 Máximo Corazón ("Maximum Heart")
 Media Falta ("Half Absence")
 Mía, Sólo Mía ("Mine, Only Mine")
 Mil Millones ("A Billion")
 Milady
 Montaña Rusa ("Rollercoaster")
 Naranja y Media ("Orange and a Half")
 Niní ("Nini")
 Pasiones ("Passions")
 PH (Propiedad Horizontal) ("Horizontal Property")
 Poliladron
 Por El Nombre de Dios ("In The Name of God")
 Por Siempre Mujercitas ("Always Little Women")
 Primer amor (with G.Corrado, Grecia Colmenares) ("First Love")
 Princesa ("Princess")
 Provócame ("Provoke Me")
 Resistiré ("Forever Julia"), 2003
 Ricos y Famosos ("Rich and Famous")
 Rincón de Luz ("Corner of Light")
 Sálvame María ("Save Me Maria")
 Se Dice Amor ("It Is Called 'Love'")
 Señorita Andrea ("Miss Andrea")
 Sheik
 Soy Gina ("I'm Gina")
 Una Familia Especial ("A Special Family")
 Verano del '98 ("Endless Summer")
 Yago, Pasión Morena ("Yago, Moreno Passion")
 Zíngara: Mujer Gitana ("Gypsy Woman")

Bolivia

 Amor en tiempo seco ("The love in time of drought")
 Cambas en apuros ("Cambas in difficulties")
 Carmelo Hurtado
 Carmelo Hurtado - El Retorno ("Carmelo Hurtado Returns")
 Chantaje de Amor ("Blackmail of love")
 Coraje Salvaje ("Wild courage")
 Hotelucho ("Poor Hotel")
 Indira
 La Fundación ("The Foundation")
 La Última Expedición ("The Last Expedition")
 La Virgen de las Siete Calles ("The Virgin of the Seven Streets")
 Las Tres Perfectas Solteras ("The Three Perfect Unmarried Women")
 Los Pioneros ("The Pioneers")
 Luna de Locos ("Moon of the crazies")
 Tardes Antiguas ("Old Afternoon")
 Tierra Adentro ("Inland")
 Una Vida, Un Destino ("A life, a destiny")

Brazil

Rede Globo

 A Barba Azul ("The Blue Beard") - 1974
 A Casa das Sete Mulheres ("House of the Seven Women") - 2003
 A Deusa Vencida ("The Defeated Goddess")
 A Favorita ("The Favourite") - 2008
 A Gata Comeu ("The Cat Ate It") - 1985
 A Muralha ("The Wall") - 1968
 A Próxima Vítima ("The Next Victim") - 1995
 A Regra do Jogo ("The Rule of the Game") - 2015
 A Sucessora  ("The Successor")
 A Viagem ("The Journey") - 1994
 Além do Tempo ("Beyond Time") - 2015
 Alma Gêmea ("Soulmate") - 2005
 América ("America") - 2005
 Amor à Vida ("Love for Life") - 2013
 Anjo Mau - 1976, Anjo Mau ("Evil Angel") - 1997
 Antônio Maria
 Aritana
 As Minas de Prata ("The Silver Mines")
 Avenida Brasil ("Brazil Avenue") - 2012
 Babilônia (refers to the Rio de Janeiro slum rather than Babylon) - 2015
 Baila Comigo ("Dance With Me") - 1981
 Bandeira Dois ("Flag Two"—referring to the higher night rate on taxicabs.)
 Barriga de Aluguel ("Rent Womb") - 1990
 Beleza Pura ("Pure Beauty") - 2008
 Belíssima ("Beautiful") - 2005
 Beto Rockfeller - 1968
 Boogie Oogie - 2014
 Cama de Gato ("Cat's Cradle") - 2009
 Carinhoso ("Affectionate")
 Celebridade ("Celebrity") - 2003
 Cheias de Charme ("All Charming") - 2012
 Chocolate com Pimenta ("Chocolate and Pepper") - 2003
 Cidadão Brasileiro ("Brazilian Citizen") - 2006
 Ciranda de Pedra  ("Marble Dance") - 2008
 Cobras & Lagartos ("Snakes & Lizards") - 2006
 Coração de Estudante ("Student's Heart") - 2002
 Da Cor do Pecado ("Shades of Sin") - 2004
 Dancin' Days - 1978
 Desejo Proibido ("Forbidden Desire") - 2007
 Dona Beija - 1986
 Duas Caras ("Two-Faces") - 2008
 Em Família ("In Family") - 2014
 Éramos Seis ("We Were Six")
 Escalada ("The Way Up")
 Escrava Isaura ("Isaura - Slave Girl")
 Estúpido Cupido ("Stupid Cupid")
 Eta Mundo Bom! ("What a Good World!") - 2016
 Eterna Magia ("Eternal Magic") - 2007
 Feijão Maravilha ("Wonderful Bean")
 Guerra dos Sexos ("War of the Sexes")
 História de Amor ("Love Story") - 1995
 Hoje é dia de Maria ("Today is Mary's Day")
 Ídolo de Pano ("Cloth Idol")
 Império ("Empire") - 2014
 Insensato Coração ("Reckless Heart") - 2011
 Irmãos Coragem ("Brave Brothers")
 JK (Screen adaptation of the autobiography of Juscelino Kubitschek, Brazilian President from 1956 to 1961) - 2006
 Joia Rara ("Rare Jewel") - 2013
 Gabriela
 Laços de Família ("Family Ties") - 2000
 Liberdade, Liberdade ("Freedom, Freedom") - 2016
 Locomotivas ("Locomotives"—a 1970s slang for beautiful woman) - 1977
 Mad Maria
 Meu Rico Português ("My Rich Portuguese")
 Minha Doce Namorada ("My Sweet Girlfriend")
 Mulheres Apaixonadas ("Women in Love") - 2003
 Mulheres de Areia ("Women of Sand") - 1993
 Negócio da China ("China Business") - 2008
 Ninho da Serpente ("Snake's Nest")
 Nino, o Italianinho ("Nino, The Little Italian")
 O Astro (1977 TV series) - 1977
 O Astro (2011 TV series) - 2011
 O Beijo do Vampiro ("Kiss of the Vampire") - 2002
 O Bem-Amado ("The Well-Loved") - 1973
 O Casarão ("The Manor")
 O Clone ("The Clone") - 2001
 O Cravo e a Rosa ("The Carnation and the Rose") - 2000
 O Direito de Nascer ("The Right to Be Born") - 1964
 O Direito de Nascer - 1978
 O Espigão ("The Skyscraper")
 O Machão ("The Macho Man")
 O Profeta ("The Prophet")
 O Rebu ("The Big Confusion")
 O Rei do Gado ("The Cattle King") - 1996
 Os Imigrantes ("The Immigrants")
 Os Ossos do Barão ("The Bones of the Baron")
 Páginas da Vida ("Pages of Life") - 2006
 Pai Herói ("Hero Father") - 1979
 Paixões Proibidas ("Forbidden Loves")
 Pão pão, Beijo beijo ("Bread Bread, Kiss Kiss") - 1983
 Paraíso Tropical ("Tropical Paradise") - 2007
 Pigmalião 70 ("Pygmalion '70") - 1970
 Por Amor ("For Love") - 1997
 Quatro por Quatro ("Four By Four") - 1994
 Que Rei Sou Eu? ("What King Am I?") - 1989
 Rainha da Sucata ("Queen of the Scrap Metal") - 1990
 Redenção ("Redemption")
 Roda de Fogo  ("Wheel of Fire") - 1986
 Roque Santeiro - 1985
 Salve Jorge ("Hail George") - 2012
 Sangue do Meu Sangue ("Blood of My Blood")
 Saramandaia
 Selva de Pedra ("Stone Jungle")
 Senhora do Destino ("Lady of Destiny") - 2004
 Sete Pecados ("Seven Sins") - 2007
 Sete Vidas ("Seven Lives") - 2015
 Sinhá Moça ("Little Missy", "Niña Moza")
 Sonho Meu ("My Dream") - 1993
 Terra Nostra (Italian for "Our Land") - 1999
 Tieta - 1989
 Totalmente Demais ("Totally Awesome") - 2015
 Três Irmãs ("Three Sisters") - 2008
 Um Só Coração ("Only One Heart") - 2004
 Vale Tudo ("Anything Goes") - 1988
 Vamp - 1991
 Velho Chico ("Old Chico", referring to the São Francisco River) - 2016
 Verdades Secretas ("Secret Truths") - 2015
 Vereda Tropical ("Tropical Path") - 1984

Rede Record

 Alta Estação  ("High Season")
 Amor e Intrigas  ("Love and Intrigue")
 Bicho do Mato ("Wild Animal")
 Caminhos do Coração  ("Ways of the Heart")
 Os Mutantes: Caminhos do Coração  ("The Mutants: Ways of the Heart"—spin-off from the above)
 Chamas da Vida ("Flames of Life")
 Dona Xepa
 Escrava Mãe ("Mother Slave")
 Essas Mulheres ("Those Women")
 José do Egito ("Joseph of Egypt")
 Luz do Sol ("Light of the Sun")
 Os Dez Mandamentos ("The Ten Commandments")
 Pecado Mortal ("Mortal Sin")
 Poder Paralelo ("Parallel Power")
 Prova de Amor ("Test of Love")
 Rebelde
 Sol de Verão ("Summer Sun")
 Vidas Opostas ("Opposite Lives")
 Vitória ("Victory")

Rede Bandeirantes
 Água na Boca ("Water in My Mouth")
 Água Viva ("Jellyfish")
 Dance, Dance, Dance
 Floribella

Sistema Brasileiro de Televisão
 Amor e Revolução  ("Love and Revolution")
 Carrossel
 Chiquititas
 O Direito de Nascer (2001 version)
 Éramos Seis

Rede Manchete
 Kananga do Japão ("Japan's House")
 Pantanal
 Xica da Silva

Canada
4 et demi... (4:30)
Diva
Francoeur
Jasmine
La famille Plouffe
Lance et Compte
Le Coeur a ses raisons
Les Belles Histoires des pays d'en haut
Les Dames de coeur
Virginie

Chile

 A La Sombra del Angel ("In the shadow of the angel")
 A Todo Dar  ("Top Speed")
 Adrenalina ("Adrenaline")
 Algo está cambiando  ("Something's Changing")
 Alguien te mira  ("Somebody is looking at you")
 Ámame  ("Love me")
 Amor a domicilio ("Love for Delivery")
 Amor por accidente
 Amores de mercado ("Loves from the Market")
 Angel malo ("Bad Angel", remake of Anjo Mau)
 Aquelarre ("Witches' sabbath")
 Bellas y audaces ("Beautiful and bold girls")
 Brujas ("Witches")
 Cerro Alegre  ("Happy Hill")
 Champaña ("Champagne")
 Cómplices ("Accomplices")
 Destinos Cruzados ("Crossed Destinies")
 Don Amor  ("Mr. Love")
 El amor está de moda  ("The love is quite the thing")
 El Circo de las Montini  ("The Montini's Circus")
 El Señor de la Querencia  ("The Lord of the haunt")
 Estúpido Cupido ("Stupid Cupid", remake of Estúpido Cupido)
 Fuera de control ("Out of Control")
 Gatas y tuercas ("Jacks and Nuts")
 Hijos del Monte ("Monte's sons")
 Hippie
 Ídolos ("Idols")
 Iorana (rapa nui word for "Hello")
 Jaque Mate ("Checkmate")
 Juegos de fuego ("Fire games")
 La Dama del Balcón ("The Lady of the Balcony")
 La Fiera ("The Wild Animal")
 La Invitación ("The Invitation")
 La Madrastra ("The Stepmother")
 La Quintrala ("A female character of the Chilean History")
 La Torre 10 ("The tower 10")
 La última cruz ("The last cruise")
 Loca piel ("Crazy skin")
 Los Capo ("The Capos")
 Los Pincheira ("The Pincheiras")
 Los títeres ("The Puppets")
 Los 30  ("30")
 Machos ("Macho Men")
 Mala Conducta  ("Bad Behavior")
 Marparaíso
 Marrón Glacé
 Matrimonio de Papel ("Marriage of paper")
 Mi nombre es Lara ("My name's Lara")
 Oro verde ("Green gold")
 Pampa Ilusión  ("Illusion of Pampa")
 Papi Ricky
 Playa Salvaje ("Wild Beach")
 Purasangre ("Bloodstock")
 Rojo y miel ("Red and Honey")
 Romané ("Gypsies")
 Rompecorazón ("Heartbreaker")
 Rossabella
 Santo Ladrón ("Saint thief")
 Semidiós  ("Semigod")
 Sucupira
 Tentación  ("Temptation")
 Tic tac
 Trampas y Caretas ("Cheats and Masks")
 Floribella
 Villa Nápoli ("Napoli villa")
 Viuda Alegre ("Cheerful")

Colombia

Croatia

AVA Production 
 Villa Maria ("Villa Maria") (2004-2005)
 Ljubav u zaleđu ("Love in offside") (2005-2006)
 Obični ljudi ("Regular people") (2006-2007)
 Ponos Ratkajevih ("Ratkaj's proud") (2007-2008)
 Zakon ljubavi ("The law of love") (2008)

RTL Televizija 
 Ne daj se, Nina ("Don't give up, Nina") (2008)
 Ruža vjetrova ("Rose of winds") (2011-2013)
 Tajne ("Secrets") (2013-2014)
 Vatre ivanjske ("Ivanja fires") (2014-2015)
 Prava žena ("Truly women") (2016-2017)

Ring Multimedia 
 Sve će biti dobro ("Everything is going to be fine") (2008-2009)
 Dolina sunca ("Valley of the sun") (2009–2010)
 Pod sretnom zvijezdom ("Under a lucky star") (2011)

Nova TV 
 Najbolje godine ("The best years") (2009-2011)
 Larin izbor ("Lara's choice") (2011–2013)
 Zora dubrovačka ("Dubrovnik's dawns") (2013-2014)
 Kud puklo da puklo ("No mather what") (2014-2016)
 Zlatni dvori ("Golden palace") (2016-2017)
 Čista ljubav ("Pure love") (2017–2018)

Dominican Republic
 María José, Oficios Del Hogar ("María José, Housewife")
 Catalino El Dichoso ("Lucky Catalino")
 En La Boca De Los Tiburones ("Inside The Sharks' Mouth")
 Trópico ("Tropical Paradise")

El Salvador
Más allá de la angustia ("Beyond the anguish")

Germany
 Alisa – Folge deinem Herzen – "Alisa – Follow your Heart" (2009)
 Anna und die Liebe – "Anna and Love" (2008–2009)
 Bianca – Wege zum Glück – "Bianca – Ways to Happiness" (2004–2005)
 Das Geheimnis meines Vaters – "Mystery of my Father" (2006)
 Lotta in Love (2006–2007)
 Rote Rosen – "Red Roses" (since 2006)
 Tessa – Leben für die Liebe – "Tessa – A Life for Love" (2005–2006)
 Schmetterlinge im Bauch – "Love is in the air" (2006–2007)
 Sophie – Braut wider Willen – "Sophie – The Unwilling Bride" (2005–2006)
 Sturm der Liebe – "Tempest of Love" (since 2005)
 Verliebt in Berlin – "Falling in Love in Berlin" (2005–2007)
 Wege zum Glück – "Ways to Happiness" (2005–2009)

Hungary

Paprika Studios
 Oltári csajok – "Glorious Gals" (2017–2018)

Mexico

Televisa

 Abismo de pasión - "Abyss of Passion" (2012)
 Abrázame muy fuerte - "Hold Me Very Tightly" (2000-2001)
 Agujetas de color de rosa - "Pink-colored Shoelaces" (1994)
 Al diablo con los guapos - "To Hell with the Handsome" (2007–2008)
 Alborada - "Dawn" (2006)
 Alcanzar una estrella - "Reach a Star" (1990)
 Alcanzar una estrella II - "Reach a Star II" (1991)
 Alegrijes y Rebujos - "Alegrijes & Rebujos" (2004)
 Alguna Vez Tendremos Alas - "Someday We Shall Have Wings" (1997)
 Alma de Hierro - "Soul of Iron" (2008)
 Alondra - "Alondra" (1995–1996)
 Amar sin límites - "Loving without Limits" (2006)
 Amarte es mi pecado - "Loving You is My Sin" (2004)
 Amigas y rivales - "Friends and Rivals" (2001)
 Amigo de Insectos - "Bug Buddies" (2010)
 Amigos x siempre - "Friends Forever" (2000)
 Amor- "Love" (2011)
 Amor de nadie - "Nobody's Love" (1985)
 Amor en silencio - "Love in Silence" (1988)
 Amor Gitano - "Gypsy Love" (1998)
 Amor real - "True Love" (2005)
 Amor sin maquillaje - "Love Without Make-up" (2007)
 Amores verdaderos - "True loves" (2012-2013)
 Amy, la niña de la mochila azul - "Amy, The Little Girl with the Blue Backpack" (2005)
 Ana del aire (1973–1974)
 Apuesta por un amor - "Bet For a Love" (2003)
 Atrévete a soñar - "Dare to Dream" (2009-2010)
 Ave fénix - "Phoenix" (1986)
 Aventuras en el tiempo - "Adventures in Time" (2001)
 Bajo la Misma Piel - "Beneath the Same Skin" (2005)
 Bajo las riendas del amor - "Underneath The Reigns of Love" (2007)
 Barrera de Amor - "Barrier of Love" (2005)
 Bodas de odio - "Weddings of Hate" (1983)
 Brittania Fuerte - "Spanish Love" (2012–2013)
 Cadenas de amargura - "Chains of Bitterness" (1991)
 Camaleones - "Cameleon" (2009–2010)
 Camila (1998)
 Cañaveral de Pasiones - "Sugarcane Field of Passions" (1996–1997), remake of Canavial de Paixões
 Carita de Ángel - "Little Angel Face" (1999–2000)
 Carrusel - "Carrousel" (1989)
 Carrusel de las Américas - "Carrousel of the Americas" (1992)
 Chispita- "Little Spark" (1982)
 Cicatrices de Alma- "Scars of The Soul" (1986)
 Clase 406 - "Class 406" (2002-2003)
 Código Postal - "Zip Code" (2006)
 Colorina (1980)
 Cómplices al rescate - "Accomplices to the Rescue" (2002)
 Confidente de Secundaria - "Middle School Confidant" (1995)
 Contra Viento y Marea - "Against Wind and Tide" (2005)
 Corazón Indomable - "Wild at Heart" (2013)
 Corazón salvaje - "Wild Heart" (1993)
 Corazón Salvaje (2009 TV series)- "Wild Soul" (2009 - 2010)
 Corona de lágrimas- "Crown of Tears"
 Cuando llega el amor - "When Love Comes" (1989–1990)
 Cuando me enamoro - "When I fall in Love" (2010–2011)
 Cuidado con el Ángel - "Watch out for the Angel" (2008)
 Cuna de lobos - "Cradle of Wolves" (1986)
 De frente al sol - "Facing the Sun" (1992)
 De pocas, pocas pulgas - "Of Few Fleas" (2003)
 De pura sangre- "Of Pure Blood" (1990)
 Décadas - "Decade" (2011)
 Dos mujeres, un camino - "Two Women, One Path" (1993-1994)
 Dos vidas - "Two Lives" (1988)
 Duelo de Pasiones - "Duel of Passions" (2006)
 Dulce Desafío - "Sweet Challenge" (1990)
 El Amor No Tiene Precio - "Love Doesn't Have a Price"
 El Camino Secreto - "The Secret Path" (1988)
 El carruaje - "The Carriage" (1985)
 El Cartel - "(Mexico's Version)" (2011 - 2012)
 El derecho de nacer - "The Right to be Born" (It has three versions: 1961, 1981 and 2001)
 El diario de Daniela - "Daniela's Diary" (1998)
 El Extraño Retorno de Diana Salazar - "The Strange Return of Diana Salazar" (1988)
 El hogar que yo robé - "The Home I Stole" (1971)
 El juego de la vida - "The Game of Life" (2002)
 El maleficio - "The Curse" (1983)
 El Manantial - "The Spring" (2001)
 El Pecado de Oyuki - "Oyuki's sin" (1988)
 El precio de tu amor - "The Price of Your Love" (2000)
 El premio mayor - "The Major Prize" (1995-1996)
 El privilegio de amar - "The privilege of Loving" (1997–1998)
 El Triunfo del Amor - "Triumph of Love" (2010–2011)
 El Vuelo del Aguila- "The Flight of the Eagle" (1999)
 En Nombre del Amor - "In the Name of Love" (2008)
 Entre el Amor y el Odio - "Between Love and Hate" (2002)
 Esmeralda (1997)
 Esperándote - "Waiting for You" (1985)
 Esperanza del Corazón - "Hope of the heart" (2011) 
 Fuego en le sangre - "Fire in the Blood" (2008)
 Gabriel y Gabriela - "Gabriel and Gabriela" (1986)
 Guadalupe (1984)
 Hasta Que El Dinero Nos Separe - "Until Money Do Us Part" (2009–2010)
 Herencia maldita - "Cursed Inheritance"
 Heridas de Amor - "Wounds of Love" (2006–2007)
 Huracan - "Hurricane" (1997-1998)
 Imperio de Cristal - "Crystal Empire" (1994)
 Inocente de Ti - "Innocent of You" (2005)
 Juana Iris (1985)
 Laberintos de pasión (1999-2000)
 La Antorche Encendida - "The Lighted Torch" (1996)
 La casa en la playa - "Beach House" (2000)
 La constitución - "The Constitution" (1958)
 La Desalmada - "Heartless" (2021)
 La Dueña- "The Owner" (1995)
 La Esposa Virgen - "The Virgin Wife" (2005)
 La Fea Más Bella - "The Prettiest Ugly Woman" (2006)
 La fuerza del amor - "The Strength of Love"
 La Fuerza del destino - "The Strength of Destiny" (2011)
 La Intrusa - "The Intruder" (2001)
 La Madrastra - "The Stepmother" (2005)
 La Mentira - "The Lie" (1998)
 La Otra - "The Other Woman" (2002)
 La pasión de Isabela - "Isabela's passion) (1984)
 La Pobre Señorita Limantour - "The Poor Miss Limantour" (1989)
 La que no podía amar - "The one who could not love" (2011-2012)
 La sonrisa del Diablo - "The Smile of the Devil" (1992)
 La Traición- "The Treason" (1984)
 La trampa - "The Trap" (1988)
 La usurpadora - "The Usurper" (1998)
 La venganza - "Vengeance" (1977)
 La Verdad Oculta - "The Hidden Truth" (2005–2006)
 Laberintos de pasión - "Labyrinths of Passion" (1999-2000)
 Las Dos Caras de Ana - "The Two Faces of Ana" (2006)
 Las Tontas No Van al Cielo - "Dumb Women Don't Go To Heaven" (2007–2008)
 Las Vías del Amor - "The Paths of Love" (2002)
 Lazos de Amor- "Love Ties" (1995)
 Llena de Amor- "Full of Love" (2010)
 Locura de Amor - "Crazy Love" (1999–2000)
 Lola...Érase una vez - "Lola... Once upon a time" (2007)
 Los años pasan "Years pass" (1985)
 Los Hijos De Nadie- "Nobody's Children"
 Los parientes pobres - "The Poor Kin" (1993)
 Los Ricos También Lloran - "Rich People Also Cry" (1979)
 Lo que la vida me robó - "What Life Took From Me" (2014)
 Luz Clarita -"Clear Light" (1996)
 Luz y sombra - "Light and Shadow" (1989)
 Mañana Es Para Siempre - "Tomorrow is forever" (2009)
 Mañana Será Otro Día - "Tomorrow Will Be Another Day"
 Mar de amor - "Curse by the sea" (2009)
 María Belén - (2001)
 Maria Isabel (1997)
 María la del Barrio - "Maria from the Ghetto" (1995)
 Maria Mercedes (1992)
 Mariana de la noche - "Mariana of the Night" (2003)
 Marimar (1994)
 Marisol (1996)
 Martín Garatuza
 Mi Destino Eres Tú - "My Destiny is You" (2000)
 Mi Pecado - "Burden of guilt " (2009)
 Mi Pequeña Soledad - "My Little Loneliness" (1991)
 Mi pequeña traviesa - "My Mischievous Little One" (1997–1998)
 Mi Segunda Madre- "My Second Mother" (1990)
 Milagro y magia - "Miracle and Magic" (1991)
 Misión S.O.S - "S.O.S Mission" (2005)
 Monte Calvario - "Calvary Mountain"
 Morir para vivir - "Die to live" (1989)
 Muchacha italiana viene a casarse - "Italian Girl Comes to get Married" (1970)
 Muchachitas - "Young Girls" (1991)
 Muchachitas como tú - "Young Girls like you" (2007)
 Mujer de Nadie - "A Woman of Her Own" (2022)
 Mujer de Madera - "Woman of wood" (2004)
 Mujeres Engañadas - "Women (Who Have Been Cheated On)" (1999-2000)
 Mundo de Fieras - "World of Wilds" (2006)
 Mundo de juguete - "Toy world" (1976)
 Navidad sin fin - "Neverending Christmas" (2000)
 Niña Amada Mía - "My Loved Girl" (2004)
 Nunca te olvidaré - "I Will Never Forget You" (1999)
 Pablo y Andrea - "Pablo and Andrea" (2006)
 Pasión - "Passion" (2007)
 Pasión y poder - "Passion and Power" (1988)
 Peregrina- "Pilgrim" (2006)
 Piel de otoño - "Autumn Skin" (2004)
 Por tu amor - "For your Love" (1999)
 Por un beso - "For a Kiss" (2000)
 Preciosa - "Precious" (1999)
 Primer amor... a mil por hora - "First Love...at 1000 per hour" (2000–2001)
 Prisionera de amor - "Prisoner of Love" (1994)
 Pura Sangre - "Pure Blood"
 Querida Enemiga - "Dearest Enemy" (2008)
 Quinceañera- "Quinceañera" (1987–1988)
 Rafaela más que una historia de amor - "Rafaela more than a love story" (2011)
 Ramona (1999–2000)
 Rebelde (Mexican telenovela) - "Rebel" (2004-2006)
 Rina (1977)
 Rosa salvaje - "Wild Rose" (1987)
 Rosalinda (1999)
 Rubí - "Ruby" (1974 and 2005)
 Salomé "Salome" (2002)
 Sandra y Paulina - "Sandra and Paulina"
 Seducción - "Seduction" (1986)
 Señora tentación - "Mrs. Temptation"
 Si nos dejan - "If They Let Us" (2021)
 Simplemente María - "Simply Maria" (1989)
 Soledad (1980)
 Soñadoras - "Dreamers" (1998)
 Sortilegio - "Spell" (2009)
 Soy Tu Dueña - "I'm Your Owner" (2010)
 Sueños y Caramelos- "Dreams & Sweets" (2006–2007)
 Te sigo amando - "I'm Still in Love with You" (1997)
 Teresa (1989)
 Teresa (2010 TV Series) - "Teresa" (2010–2011)
 Tormenta en el paraíso - (2009)
 Tres mujeres - "Three Women" (1999)
 Triángulo - "Triangle" (1992)
 Triunfo del amor - "Love Triumph" (2011)
 Tu o Nadie - "You or No One" (1985)
 Un Gancho al Corazon - "A Jab to the Heart" (2008)
 Valentina (1993)
 Valeria y Maximiliano "Valeria and Maximiliano" (1990)
 Vanessa (1982)
 Verano de amor - "Summer of love" (2009)
 Victoria (1987)
 ¡Vivan los niños! - "Long Live the Kids" (2004)
 Viviana (1978)
 Vivir un poco - "To Live a Little" (1985)
 Volver a Empezar - "Starting Over" (1994–1995)
 Yara - "Yara" (1979) 
 Yesenia (1987)
 Yo amo a Juan Querendón - "I Love Juan Querendon" (2007–2008)
 Yo compro esa mujer - "I Buy That Woman"

TV Azteca

 Agua y Aceite- "Water & Oil"
 Al Norte del Corazon- "To the North of the Heart"
 Amor en Custodia - "Love in Custody"
 Amores... Querer con Alevosía- "Loves... to Love with an advantage"
 Azul Tequila - "Tequila Blue"
 Belinda
 Bellezas Indomables- "Untaimed Beauties"
 Besos Prohibidos- "Forbidden Kisses"
 Cara o cruz- "Heads or Tails"
 Catalina y Sebastián- "Catalina and Sebastian"
 Cielo rojo- "Red Sky"
 Como en el cine- "Like in the movies"
 Con Toda el Alma- "With all my Soul"
 Contrato de Amor- "Love Contract"
 Cuando Seas Mia- "When you're Mine"
 Demasiado Corazón - "Too Much Heart"
 Destino - "Destiny"
 Dos chicos de cuidado en la ciudad- "Two guys to be careful of... in the city"
 El Alma Herida- "The Wounded Soul"
 El Amor de Mi Vida- "The Love of my Life"
 El amor no es como lo pintan- "Love is not like what they tell you"
 El Candidato- "The Candidate"
 El País de las Mujeres- "The Country of Women"
 Ellas, inocentes o culpables- "Them, Innocents or Guilty"
 Emperatriz- "Empress"
 Enamórate- "Falling in love"
 Golpe Bajo- "Low Punch"
 Háblame de Amor- "Talk to me about Love"
 La Calle de las Novias- "The Bride Street"
 La Chacala- "The (female) Jackal"
 La duda- "The Doubt"
 La Heredera- "The Heiress"
 La Hija del Jardinero- "The Gardener´s daughter"
 La mujer de Judas- "The Woman of Judas"
 La otra cara del alma- "The Other Face of The Soul"
 La Otra Mitad del Sol- "The Other Half of the Sun"
 La Vida en el Espejo- "The Life in the Mirror"
 Las Juanas - "The Juanas (family)"
 Lo que es el amor - "What Love Is"
 Los Sánchez- "The Sanchezes(family)"
 Marea Brava- "Strong Tide"
 Mientras Haya Vida- "While there´s still life"
 Mirada de mujer- "A Woman's Glance"
 Mirada de Mujer: El Regreso- "A Woman´s Glance: The Return"
 Montecristo- "Montecristo"
 Nada personal - "Nothing Personal"
 Noche Eterna- "Everlasting Night"
 Perla - "Pearl"
 Por Tí- "For You"
 Rivales por Accidente- "Rivals by accident"
 Romántica Obsesión- "Romantic Obsession"
 Señora- "Lady"
 Sin Tí- "Without You"
 Soñarás- "You'll dream"
 Súbete a mi moto- "Get on my motorcycle"
 Tengo Todo excepto a Tí- "I have everything but you"
 Tentaciones- "Temptations"
 Tiempo de Amar- "Time to Love"
 Tío Alberto- "Uncle Albert"
 Todo por Amor- "All for Love"
 Top Models
 Tres Veces Sofía- "Three Times Sofia"
 Un Nuevo Amor- "A New Love"
 Vivir Sin Ti/Vivir Por Ti- "To Live Without You / To Live For You"
 Vivir un poco- "To Live a little"
 Yacaranday

Argos Comunicación
 Amor Descarado "Shameless Love"
 Amores... Querer con Alevosía- "Loves... to Love with an advantage"
 Cara o cruz- "Heads or Tails"
 Contrato de Amor- "Love Contract"
 Corazón Partido- "Broken Heart"
 Daniela
 Demasiado Corazón- "Too Much Heart"
 El Amor de Mi Vida- "The Love of My Life"
 El Alma Herida- "The Wounded Soul"
 Gitanas "Gypsies" (co-produced with Telemundo)
 La Vida en el Espejo- "The Life in the Mirror"
 Ladrón de Corazones- "Thief of hearts"
 Los Plateados- "The Silvers"
 Marina
 Mientras Haya Vida- "While there´s still life"
 Mirada de mujer- "A Woman's Glance"
 Mirada de Mujer: El Regreso- "A Woman´s Glance: The Return"
 Nada personal - "Nothing Personal"
 Rosa Diamante - Rose of Diamonds
 Tentaciones- "Temptations"
 Todo por Amor- "All for Love"
 Vivir Sin Ti/Vivir Por Ti- "To Live Without You / To Live For You"

Panama
 Linda Labé
 ¿Cómo casar a Chente?
 Lagrimas de Diamante
 Pobre Millonaria

Paraguay
 Papá del Corazón ("Heart Daddy")
 De Mil Amores  (Desperately in Love)
   (Mrs. Francisca Cabañas)
 Verdad Oculta

Peru
 Pobre Diabla ("Wretch")
 Luz Maria
 Leonela, Muriendo de Amor ("Leonela, Dying of Love")
 Cosas del Amor ("Things of Love")
 Cazando a un millonario ("Hunting a Millionaire")
 Girasoles para Lucía ("Sunflowers for Lucía")
 Besos robados ("Stolen Kisses")
 Carmín
 El adorable professor Aldao ("The Adorable Professor Aldao")
 Natacha
 Simplemente María ("Simply Maria")
 Travesuras del corazón ("Pranks of the Heart")
 Luciana y Nicolás ("Luciana and Nicolás")
 Me llaman Gorrión ("They call me Gorrión")
 Nino... las cosas simples de la vida ("Nino... The Simple Things in life")
 Los de arriba y los de abajo ("Those Ones From Above and Those Ones From Below")
 ¡Qué buena raza! (Pun of "What a Nerve!" literally translating "What A Good Race")
 Eva del Edén ("Eve of Eden")
 Hermanos Coraje ("Courage Brothers")
 Torbellino ("Whirlwind")
 Los unos y los otros ("The Ones and the Others")
 La Rica Vicky ("Vicky the Delightful")
 Amor serrano ("Serrano Love")
 Los Choches ("The Buddies")
 Al Fondo Hay Sitio ("There's Room At The Back")
 Gente Como Uno ("People Like One")
 Mil Oficios ("Jack of All Trades")
 Demasiada Belleza ("Too Much Beauty")
 Dina Paucar: La Lucha Por Un Sueño ("Dina Paucar: The Fight For A Dream")
 Latin lover ("Latin Lover")
 El Gran Reto ("The Great Challenge")
 Gamboa ("Gamboa")
 Paginas De La Vida ("Pages of Life")
 No Hay Por Que Llorar ("There's No Reason for Crying")
 Solo por ti ("Only For You")
 Matalache ("Matalache")
 Bésame Tonto ("Kiss me, You Dumb")
 Las Mujeres De Mi Vida ("The Women of my Life")
 Clave uno ("Code One")
 Tatán ("Tantán")
 Cuando Los Angeles Lloran ("When Angels Cry")
 Secretos ("Secrets")

Philippines

Portugal

Vila Faia (1982),(Beech Village) [RTP]
Origens (1983), (Origins) [RTP]
Chuva na Areia (1985), (The Rain on the Sand) [RTP]
Palavras Cruzadas (1987), (Crosswords) [RTP]
Passerelle (1988),  [RTP]
Ricardina e Marta (1989), [RTP]
Cinzas (1992), (Ashes) [RTP]
A Banqueira do Povo (1993), (The Banker of the People) [RTP]
Telhados de Vidro (1993), (Glass Roofs) [TVI]
Verão Quente (1993), (Hot Summer) [RTP]
Na Paz dos Anjos (1994), (In Heavenly Peace) [RTP]
Desencontros (1994), (Mismatches)  [RTP]
Roseira Brava (1995), (Briar Rose) [RTP]
Primeiro Amor (1995), (First Love) [RTP]
Vidas de Sal (1996), (Salt Lives) [RTP]
Filhos do Vento (1996), (The Children of the Wind) [RTP]
A Grande Aposta (1997), (The Great Bet) [RTP]
Terra Mãe (1998), (Motherland) [RTP]
Os Lobos (1998), (The Wolves) [RTP]
A Lenda da Garça (1999), (The Heron Legend) [RTP]
Todo o Tempo do Mundo (1999), (All the time in the world) [TVI]
Ajuste de Contas (2000), (The Reckoning) [RTP]
Jardins Proibidos (2000), (Forbidden Gardens) [TVI]
Senhora das Águas (2001), (The Lady of the Waters) [RTP]
Ganância (2001), (Greed) [SIC]
Olhos de Água (2001), (Water Eyes) [TVI]
Nunca Digas Adeus (2001), (Never say Goodbye) [TVI]
Filha do Mar (2001), (The Daughter of the Sea) [TVI]
Anjo Selvagem (2001/2002), (Wild Angel) [TVI]
Lusitana Paixão (2002), (Portuguese Passion)
Fúria de Viver (2002), (Rage of Living) [SIC]
O Olhar da Serpente (2002), (Snake Stare)
Tudo Por Amor (2002), (All for Love) [TVI]
Sonhos Traídos (2002), (Betrayed Dreams) [TVI]
O Último Beijo (2002), (The Last Kiss) [TVI]
Amanhecer (2002), (Dawn) [TVI]
O Jogo (2003), (The Game) [SIC]
Saber Amar (2003), (Know How to Love) [TVI]
Coração Malandro (2003), (Naughty Heart) [TVI]
O Teu Olhar (2003), (Your Stare) [TVI]
Queridas Feras (2003/2004), (Dear Beasts) [TVI]
Mistura Fina (2004/2005), (Fine Blend) [TVI]
Baía das Mulheres (2004/2005), (Women Bay) [TVI]
Ninguém Como Tu (2005), (No one like you) [TVI]
Mundo Meu (2005/2006), (My World) [TVI]
Dei-te Quase Tudo (2005/2006), (I gave you almost everything) [TVI]
Fala-me de Amor (2006), (Talk to me about Love) [TVI]
Floribella (2006) [SIC]
Tempo de Viver (Time to live) [TVI]
Jura (2006)  (Promise me) [SIC]
Doce Fugitiva (2006/2007), (Sweet Fugitive) [TVI]
Tu e Eu (2006/2007), (You and me) [TVI]
Paixões Proibidas (2007) (Forbidden Passions) [RTP]
Vingança (2007) (Revenge) [SIC]
Ilha dos Amores (2007), (Island of Love) [TVI]
Resistirei (2007), (I Will Resist) [SIC]
Deixa-me amar (2007), (Let Me Love) [TVI]
Fascínios (2007), (Fascinations) [TVI]
Rebelde Way (2008), (Rebel Way)
A Outra (2008), (The Other) [TVI]
Vila Faia 2008 (2008), [RTP]
Flor do Mar (2008), (Flower of the Sea) [TVI]
Olhos nos Olhos (2008), (Eye to eye) [TVI]
Podia Acabar o Mundo (2008), (It Could End the World) [SIC]
Feitiço de Amor (2008), (Love Spell) [TVI]
Deixa que te leve (2009), (Let me take you) [TVI]
Sentimentos (2009), (Feelings) [TVI]
Meu Amor (2009), (My Love) [TVI]
Perfeito Coração (2009), (Perfect Heart) [SIC]
Mar de Paixão (2010), (Sea of Passion) [TVI]
Lua Vermelha (2010), (Red Moon) [SIC]
Espírito Indomável (2010), (Wild Spirit) [TVI]
Laços de Sangue (2010), (Blood Ties)
Sedução (2010), (Seduction) [TVI]
Anjo Meu (2011), (Angel of Mine) [TVI] 
Remédio Santo (2011), (Holy Remedies) [TVI]
Rosa Fogo (2011), (Firerose) [SIC]
Doce Tentação (2012), (Sweet Temptation) [TVI]
Dancin' Days (2012)
Louco Amor (2012), (Crazy Love) [TVI]
Destinos Cruzados (2012), (Crossed Destinies) [TVI]
Doida por Ti (2012), (Crazy about You) [TVI]
Mundo Ao Contrário (2013), (World Upside Down) [TVI]
Sol de Inverno (2013), (Winter's Sun) [SIC]
Os Nossos Dias (2013), (Our Days) [RTP]
Belmonte (2013), (Belmonte) [TVI]
Mulheres (2014), (Women) [TVI]
O Beijo do Escorpião (2014), (Scorpion's Kiss) [TVI]
Água de Mar (2014), (Sea's Water) [RTP]
Mar Salgado (2014), (Salty Sea) [SIC]
Jardins Proíbidos 2014 (2014), (Forbidden Gardens 2014) [TVI]
Poderosas (2015), (Will for Revenge) [SIC]
A Única Mulher (2015), (The Only Woman) [TVI]
Coração D'ouro (2015), (Heart of Gold) [SIC]
Rainha das Flores (2016), (Frozen Memories) [SIC]
Amor Maior (2016), (More Than Love) [SIC]
Sol de Inverno (2013), (Winter's Sun) [SIC]
Espelho D'Água (2016), (Water Mirror) [SIC]
Jogo Duplo (2017), (Double Game) [TVI]
Ouro Verde (2017), (Payback) [TVI]
O Sábio (2017), (The Wise One) [RTP]
Paixão (2017), (Living Passion) [SIC]
A Herdeira (2017), (The Gipsy Heiress) [TVI]
A Teia (2018), (The Web) [TVI]
Valor da Vida (2018), (Value of Life) [TVI]
Vidas Opostas (2018), (Tangled Lives) [SIC]
Alma e Coração (2018), (Heart and Soul) [SIC]
Amar Depois de Amar (2019), (Loving After Loving) [TVI]
Prisioneira (2019), (Trapped) [TVI]
Alguém Perdeu (2019), (Someone Lost) [CMTV]
Terra Brava (2019), (Wild Land) [SIC]
Na Corda Bamba (2019), (On Thin Ice) [TVI]
Nazaré (2019), (Nazaré) [SIC]
Quer o Destino (2020), (Destiny Desires) [TVI]
Amar Demais (2020), (Unlimited Love) [TVI]
Bem Me Quer (2020), (Broken Bonds) [TVI]
Amor Amor (2021), (Love is a Song) [SIC]
A Serra (2021), (Mountain Range) [SIC]
Festa é Festa (2021), (Party is Party) [TVI]
Para Sempre (2021), (Forever) [TVI]
Quero é Viver (2022), (I want to live) [TVI]
Por Ti (2022), (For You) [SIC]
Rua das Flores (2022), (Flowers Street) [TVI]
Lua de Mel (2022), (Honeymoon) [SIC]

Puerto Rico
 El Derecho de Nacer
 Entre la Espada y la Cruz
 El Retrato de Angela
 La Divina Infiel
 Cuatro Mujeres
 La sombra del otro
 La infamia
 Cuando los Hijos Condenan
 El Hijo de Angela María
 El Rosario (The Rosary)
 La Mujer de Aquella Noche
 Conciencia Culpable
 Los Dedos de la Mano
 Marcelo y Marcelina
 Juan de Dios
 Sombras del Pasado
 Cristina Bazan
 Mujeres sin Hombres
 La Otra Mujer
 La Intrusa
 Tomiko
 Mami Santa'''
 La Sombra de Belinda El Idolo Anacaona Martha Llorens El Amor Nuestro de Cada Dia Tanairi Amame La Jibarita Fue sin Querer Escándalo Rojo Verano Modelos S.A. Vida Millie Cadenas de Amor Coralito Karina Montaner Aventurera Cuando Vuelvas Vivir Para Ti Diana Carolina Yo Se Que Mentia Apartamento de Solteras La Isla (The Island) La Otra (The other) Ave De Paso Alejandra Laura Guzman, ¡Culpable! Sombras del Pasado Preciosa La Verdadera Eva De que color es el amor? Tormento (Torment) Señora Tentación Dueña y SeñoraSerbiaJelena ("Jelena") (2004–2005)Ljubav i mržnja ("Love and hate") (2007–2008)Zaustavi vreme ("Stop the time") (2008)Istine i laži ("Truths and lies") (2017–2019)

 South Africa 

 Ashes To Ashes
 Broken Vows
 
 Giyani: Land of Blood
 
 Gold Diggers
 High Rollers
 Isibaya
 Isithembiso
Isipho
 Keeping Score
 Rockville
The River
 Uzalo
 The Queen

Turkey

 Paramparça
 Kera Sevda
 Brave and Beautiful
 Eve Donus
 Fatmagül'ün Suçu Ne?
Cesur ve guzel

SpainMarielena (1994)El Súper. Historias de todos los días (1996–99)Calle nueva (1997–2000)El secreto (2001)El secreto II (2001)Esencia de poder (2001)La verdad de Laura (2002)Géminis, venganza de amor (2002)Luna negra (2003)Obsesión (2005)El pasado es mañana (2005)Amar en tiempos revueltos (2005–12)Yo soy Bea (2006–08)Bandolera (2011–13)El secreto de Puente Viejo (2011–present)Amar es para siempre  (2013–present)Acacias 38 (2015–present)Seis Hermanas (2015–2017)

United States

Univision

Telemundo

 Pasión de Gavilanes El Cuerpo del Deseo La Patrona En otra piel La Reina del Sur Alguien te Mira La Casa de al Lado ¿Dónde está Elisa? Corazon Valiente Bajo el Mismo Cielo El Senor de los Cielos Senora Acero Duenos del Paraiso Mi Corazon Insiste en Lola Vulcan Los Miserables Tierra de Reyes El Rostro de la VenganzaMyNetworkTV
 Desire (TV series) Fashion House Wicked Wicked Games Watch Over Me American Heiress Saints & Sinners Crossed Loves Friends with Benefits Friends & Enemies Rules of DeceptionUruguay
 Las novias de Travolta (2009)
 Dance! La Fuerza del Corazón (2011)
 Porque te quiero así (2012-2011)
 Dance! (Soap Opera) (2011)

Venezuela

VenevisiónAcorralada (2007)Adorable Monica (1991)Alba Marina (1988)Alma indomable (2008)Amantes de Luna Llena (2000)Amor Comprado (2007)Amor Del Bueno (2004)Amor Mío (1997)Amor secreto (2015)Amor Sin Fronteras (1992)Ángel rebelde (2004)Arroz con leche (2007)Aunque mal paguen (2007)Bellísima (1992)Bésame Tonto (2003)Buenos días, Isabel (1980)Calypso (1999)Cara Sucia (1992)Ciudad Bendita (2006)Como tú, ninguna (1994)Condesa por Amor (2008)Contra viento y marea (1997)Corazón apasionado (2012)Corazón esmeralda (2014)Cosita linda (2014)Cosita Rica (2004)Cuando Hay Pasion (1999)Cumbres Borrascosas (1976)De todas maneras Rosa (2013)Destino de Mujer (1997)Demente criminal (2014)Dulce Enemiga (1995)El amor las vuelve locas (2005)El árbol de Gabriel (2011)El Pais de las Mujeres (1998)El Talismán (2012)Engañada (2003)Entre tu amor y mi amor (2015)Eva Luna (2010)Gata Salvaje (2002)Guerra de mujeres (2001)Harina de otro costal (2010)Ka Ina (1995)Las Amazonas (1985)La cruz del diablo (1960)Las González (2002)La heredera (1982)La mujer de Lorenzo (2003)La mujer de mi vida (1998)La mujer perfecta (2010)La Mujer Prohibida (1991)La sombra de Piera (1989)La vida entera (2008-2009)La viuda joven (2011)La Zulianita (1977)Lejana como el viento (2001)Ligia Elena (1982)Ligia Sandoval (1981)Los Donatti (1986)Los misterios del amor (2009)Los secretos de Lucía (2014)Los Querendones (2005)Lucecita (1967)Maria Celeste (1994)María del Mar (1978)María Teresa (1972)Mariana de la Noche (1976)Más que amor, frenesí (2001)Morena Clara (1996)Mi ex me tiene ganas (2012)Muñeca de trapo (2000)Natalia del Mar (2011-2012)Pecado de Amor (1995)Pecadora (2009)Peregrina (1972)Pobre Millonaria (2008)¡Qué clase de amor! (2009)Quirpa de Tres Mujeres (1996)Rebeca (2003)Rosario (2013)Sabor a ti (2004)Sacrificio de Mujer (2011)Salvador de Mujeres (2010)Samantha (telenovela) (1998)Secreto de Amor (2001)Se solicita príncipe azul (2005)Sol de Tentación (1996)Sorángel (1982)Toda Mujer (1999)Todo Sobre Camila (2002)Tomasa Tequiero (2009)Torrente (2008)Trópico (2007)Una muchacha llamada Milagros (1974)Un esposo para Estela (2009)Valeria (2008)Válgame Dios (2012)¿Vieja yo? (2008)Voltea pa' que te enamores (2006-2007)Y la luna también (1987)

RCTVA Calzon Quitao (Without underwear)Abandonada (Neglected)Abigail 1988AdrianaAlejandraAlma Mia 1988AlondraAmanda SabaterAmantes (2005)Amor a Palos (Love to Friends)Amores de Barrio Adentro (Inner-City Lovers)Amores de Fin de Siglo (End-of-Century Lovers)Anabel (Anabel)Angelica Pecado (Holy Sin)Angelito (Little Angel)Ante la Ley (In front of the Law)Asi es la Vida (Life is This Way)Atrévete (I Dare You To) 1986Aunque me Cueste la VidaAzucenaBienvenida Esperanza (A Welcomed Hope)Boves, El Urogallo (Boves, The Urogal)Camay (Cambay)Cambio de Piel (Change of Skin)Campeones (Champions)Canaima (Canaima)Cantare para Ti (I will Sing for you)Caribe (Caribbean Sea)Carissima (Charisma)Carita Pintada (Painted Face)Carmen Querida (Dear Carmen)Carolina (Carolina)Chao Cristina (See Ya, Christina)Chinita, mi amor (Dear Chinita)Cimarrón (Cimarron)Claudia (Claudia)ClemenciaCristal 1985CristinaCuando el Cielo es Más Azul (When the sky is bluer than blue)De MujeresDe Oro PuroDetrás del TelónDivina ObsesiónDoña Bárbara (1975)Dulce IlusiónEl alma no tiene color (A Colorless Soul)El Castillo de HierroEl Derecho de NacerEl DesafíoEl DesprecioEl EngañoEl Esposo de AnaísEl hombre de la máscara de hierroEl País PerdidoEl Precio de Una VidaEl Primer MilagroElizabethEmperatrizEnamoradaEntrega TotalEsmeraldaEstefaniaEstrambotica AnastasiaEva MarinaFederricoGardeniaHay Amores Que Matan (Killer Lovers)Historia de Tres HermanasHoy te ViIlusiones 1995InfigeniaJuana la VirgenJugando a GanarKapricho S.A.KassandraKiko BotonesLa Balandra Isabel llegó esta tarde (The sloop "Isabel" came this afternoon)La ComadreLa Cruz de PaloLa Cuaima (The Cuaima)La Dama de Rosa 1986La Doña Perfecta (The Perfect Housewife)La DueñaLa FieraLa GoajiritaLa Hija de Juana CrespoLa historia de un Canalla (A Coward's Story)La indomable (The Undefeated)La InolvidableLa Intrusa 1986La InvasoraLa italianitaLa Mujer de Judas ("Wife of Judas") 2002La Niña de mis ojos (My Beloved Girlfriend)La Novela de Pasion (Passion Is A Soap Opera)La Novela del Hogar (The Homemade Soap Opera)La Novela LM  (LM, The Soap Opera)La Novela Romantica (A Romantic Soap Opera)La Pasion de Teresa 1989La Posada MalditaLa SalvajeLa Señora de Cárdenas (Mr. Cárdenas' Woman)La Señorita ElenaLa Señorita PerdomoLa SoberanaLa TiranaLa TrepadoraLa ÚnicaLas BandidasLas Nuevas aventuras de FredericcoLeonela 1983Los Amores de Anita PeñaLos Ojos que Vigilan (Spying Eyes)Luisa Fernanda 1998Luisana MiaLuz MarinaLuz y sombrasMabel ValdezMama TrompetaMaria de los AngelesMaria Jose, oficios del hogarMaria, Maria 1990Mariana MontielMarielenaMariselaMariú 1999Marta y Javier 1983Mi amada Beatriz 1987Mi Gorda BellaMi Hermano Satanas (My Satanic Brothers)Mi Hijo Gabriel (My Son Gabriel)Mi prima CielaMi Secreto me CondenaMis Tres HermanasMosquita MuertaMujer con PantalonesMujer SecretaMuñequitaNatalia de 8 a 9Negra consentidaNiña mimada (The Girl Who Copies People)Niño de Papel (The Paperboy)O.K.PalmolivePeregrinaPiel de ZapaPobre Negro (Poor Negro)Por Estas CallesPor Todo lo AltoPrimaveraPura Sangre¡Qué buena se puso Lola! (How Good Lola Has It!))Que Paso con Jacqueline? 1982RafaelaRaquelReina de corazones 1998Renzo El GitanoRoberta 1987Rosa de la Calle 1982RosangelaRubi Rebelde 1989SabrinaSelva, la Virgen de BarroSelva María 1987Señora 1988Ser bonita no bastaSilvia Rivas, divorciadaSobre la Misma TierraSoltera y sin CompromisoSoniaSu Mala HoraTinieblas en el CorazónTopacio 1985Tormenta de PasiónTormentoTrapos ÍntimosTuya Para SiempreTV ConfidencialUn Pedazo de CieloValentinaViva la Pepa (Pepa Rules!)Volver a VivirYo Compro a Esa mujerTelevenDulce amargo'' (2012)

See also
List of soap operas

Telenovelas